The Ponce Sisters, Ethel (August 4, 1907 – September 24, 1989) and Dorothea (a.k.a. 'Dobbie') (December 30, 1909 – December 25, 2000 in Cincinnati, Ohio), were a popular singing sister duo in the mid-1920s and early 1930s. They were reportedly born in New York.

They were the daughters of composer, author, publisher, radio executive, and music entrepreneur Phil Ponce (1886-1945), who became the first agent-manager for Fats Waller in 1932.

Career
The duo sang on radio programs, including the Old Gold Paul Whiteman Hour, sometimes with co-star Bing Crosby, and with Fred Waring's Pennsylvanians. The sisters performed in Manhattan theaters and toured the vaudeville circuit. In 1930, they appeared in three short films produced by MGM Studios.

The sisters recorded from 1925 to 1932 for the Columbia, Gennett, Cameo, Perfect, and Edison record labels. They recorded under the names Dorothea and Ethel Ponce and as The Ponce Sisters.

Although they were not jazz singers, they did record in 1932 with jazz legends Eddie Lang (guitar), Jimmy Dorsey (cornet), and Joe Venuti (violin). Ethel, in addition to singing, played piano on some recordings. During the sisters' 1930s NBC radio network broadcasts, Ethel often augmented their vocal duets with solo piano performances of popular tunes and serious works. She was also a respected composer (under the name Ethel Ponce Fenley) of piano novelties, such as "Holiday," "Blue Haze," and "Happy Landing," as well as a writer of commercial jingles. She was represented as a composer by ASCAP.

In 1935 the Ponce Sisters stopped performing as a duo following Ethel's marriage. Dorothea continued as a soloist on radio station WLW until 1937, when she married Ohio industrialist J. Richard Verkamp.

In the 1950s Ethel performed several of her compositions with the Cincinnati Symphony Orchestra. She also wrote and performed  jingles for such products as Bavarian Beer and the Yellow Pages.

MGM/United Artists released a laser disc set of early "talkies" (sound films) entitled "Dawn Of Sound, Volume 3," which featured Vitaphone shorts of the Ponce Sisters singing "Ten Little Miles From Town" and "Oh, You Have No Idea."

Historical audio
 "You've Got Everything," sung by Ethel and Dorothea Ponce on radio station WLW, Cincinnati, ca. 1932
 Audio of two 1925 Ponce Sisters recordings ("Let's Wander Away" and "Someone is Losin' Susan") for Edison Records

References
 Dorothea Ponce Verkamp obituary from Variety, January 17, 2001
 Gravesite of Dorothea Ponce Verkamp
 
 Coming to Light: Joe Venuti, Eddie Lang, and The Ponce Sisters, Boston Phoenix, December 5–12, 2002
 Index of performances by the Ponce Sisters on the Old Gold Paul Whiteman Hour in 1929

Vaudeville performers
American girl groups
Columbia Records artists
Edison Records artists
Sibling duos
Gennett Records artists
American women singers
American pop music groups
Family musical groups